The 2007/08 FIS Nordic Combined World Cup was the 25th world cup season, a combination of ski jumping and cross-country skiing organized by FIS. The season started on 30 November 2007 and lasted until 9 March 2008.

Calendar

Men 

1 = originally scheduled Gundersen method was replaced with mass start, because the track was destroyed over a strong wind. 10 km cross-country run was on 19 January 2008, but ski jumping round was postponed on the next day over a strong wind.
2 = on 27 January ski jumping round was cancelled for strong wind and fog, that's why only 7.5 km sprint was organized this day. As for final result they just added previous day competition ski jumping round.
3 = Because of the bad weather forecast they switched the disciplines. Cross-country run in the morning and ski jumping round in the afternoon.
4 = Because of the bad weather forecast ski jumping round for competition on 8 March was already organized on 7 March.

Standings

Overall

Standings after 20 events.

Sprint

Standings after 10 events.

Nations Cup 

Standings after 20 event.

References
 Official home page, from FIS

Fis Nordic Combined World Cup, 2007-08
Fis Nordic Combined World Cup, 2007-08
FIS Nordic Combined World Cup